Radiohead: The Best Of is a greatest hits album by the English rock band Radiohead, released on 2 June 2008 by Parlophone Records in the UK and by Capitol Records in the US, subsidiaries of EMI. It contains songs from Radiohead's first six albums, recorded while they were under contract with EMI. The compilation debuted at number 4 on the UK Albums Chart and received mostly positive reviews. Radiohead had no creative input and were critical of the release.

Release 
Radiohead recorded their first six albums under contract with EMI. After they chose not to renew their contract, EMI released The Best Of and a box set of Radiohead albums to boost their revenue. Radiohead had no creative input, and were reportedly "enraged", seeing best-of compilations as typical of artists in commercial and creative decline. Singer Thom Yorke said:

In 2016, Radiohead's back catalogue was transferred to XL Recordings. The Best Of and the "special editions" of Radiohead albums, issued by EMI in the same year without Radiohead's approval, were removed from streaming services.

Content 
The standard edition of The Best Of contains 17 tracks from Radiohead's first six albums. The special edition contains a second CD with 13 additional tracks, including the B-side "Talk Show Host" and the live track "True Love Waits", from I Might Be Wrong: Live Recordings (2001). A DVD compilation with 21 music videos, including nine never before released on DVD, was also released.

Reception 

Radiohead: The Best Of debuted at number 4 on the UK Albums Chart and received generally positive reviews.

Pitchfork critic Scott Plagenhoef praised the quality of the songs, but felt the compilation was unnecessary as Radiohead did not have a "winding, difficult discography to navigate". He wrote that the standard edition contained too many songs from their 90s albums The Bends and OK Computer, and that the expanded special edition missed an opportunity to collect B-sides or rarities.

Track listing
All songs written by Radiohead (Colin Greenwood, Ed O'Brien, Jonny Greenwood, Philip Selway, and Thom Yorke), except where noted.

Note: "Optimistic (Edit)" is only on some releases of the album.

Special edition 

In 2008, Radiohead released a special edition of The Best Of including a bonus disc with 13 extra songs.

Track listing
All songs written by Radiohead (Colin Greenwood, Ed O'Brien, Jonny Greenwood, Philip Selway, and Thom Yorke), except where noted.

Disc one

Note: "Optimistic (Edit)" is only on some releases of the album.

Disc two

DVD

On 2 June 2008, Radiohead released a compilation of all their music videos from 1992 to 2003, excluding "Lucky", "Palo Alto", "Idioteque", "Morning Bell", "Motion Picture Soundtrack", "The National Anthem" (MTV Latin America contest), "I Might Be Wrong" (Alternative Video) and "How to Disappear Completely" (Live).

Track listing
"Creep (Radio Version)" (directed by Brett Turnbull)
"Anyone Can Play Guitar" (directed by Dwight Clarke)
"Pop Is Dead" (directed by Dwight Clarke)
"Stop Whispering" (directed by Jeff Plansker)
"My Iron Lung" (directed by Brett Turnbull)
"High and Dry" (UK version) (directed by David Mould)
"High and Dry" (US version) (directed by Paul Cunningham)
"Fake Plastic Trees" (directed by Jake Scott)
"Just" (directed by Jamie Thraves)
"Street Spirit (Fade Out)" (directed by Jonathan Glazer)
"Paranoid Android" (directed by Magnus Carlsson)
"Karma Police" (directed by Jonathan Glazer)
"No Surprises" (directed by Grant Gee)
"Pyramid Song" (directed by Shynola)
"Knives Out" (directed by Michel Gondry)
"I Might Be Wrong" (directed by Sophie Muller)
"Push Pulk/Like Spinning Plates" (directed by Johnny Hardstaff)
"There There" (directed by Chris Hopewell)
"Go to Sleep" (directed by Alex Rutterford)
"Sit Down. Stand Up." (directed by Ed Holdsworth)
"2 + 2 = 5" (Live at Belfort Festival) (directed by Fabien Raymond)

Note: Unlike the CD, "Creep" is the censored version instead of the explicit version. The video for "Push Pulk/Like Spinning Plates" is a combination of two songs, "Pulk/Pull Revolving Doors" and "Like Spinning Plates", both from their 2001 studio album Amnesiac.

Charts and certifications

Charts

Certifications

References

External links

2008 greatest hits albums
Albums produced by John Leckie
Albums produced by Nigel Godrich
Albums produced by Paul Q. Kolderie
Albums produced by Sean Slade
Radiohead video albums
2008 video albums
Music video compilation albums
Parlophone compilation albums
Capitol Records compilation albums
Parlophone video albums
Radiohead compilation albums
Unauthorized albums